Sir Albert Joseph Walsh (April 3, 1900 – December 12, 1958) was Commissioner of Home Affairs and Education and chief justice of the Dominion of Newfoundland, and its first lieutenant governor upon its admission to the Canadian Confederation.

Early life and education

Walsh was born in Holyrood, Newfoundland, and was educated St. Bonaventure's College and Dalhousie University. He was principal of the Roman Catholic Academy in Harbour Grace from 1917 to 1924. Walsh had studied law and was admitted to the bar at both Newfoundland and Nova Scotia.

Political career

Walsh was a supporter for Sir Richard Squires and was elected MHA for the district of Harbour Main in 1928 and became speaker of the house. He lost his seat in the 1932 election and became district magistrate for five years for Grand Falls and then Corner Brook. In 1944 he was appointed to Newfoundland's Commission of Government as Commissioner of Home Affairs and Education and in 1947 he was given the portfolio of Justice of Defense.

Walsh had chaired the delegation for terms of union with Canada and on Confederation he was appointed Lieutenant Governor. He resigned that same year to become the province's Chief Justice. He also sat on the United Nations panel for examination of international disputes.

Walsh was knighted in 1949.

See also
List of people of Newfoundland and Labrador

External links
Biography at Government House The Governorship of Newfoundland and Labrador

Canadian Knights Bachelor
Dalhousie University alumni
Schulich School of Law alumni
People from Holyrood, Newfoundland and Labrador
1900 births
1958 deaths
Lieutenant Governors of Newfoundland and Labrador
Speakers of the Newfoundland and Labrador House of Assembly
Members of the Newfoundland Commission of Government
Dominion of Newfoundland politicians
Dominion of Newfoundland judges